The Legend of Hallowdega is a 2010 black comedy fantasy mockumentary short film, directed by Terry Gilliam from a screenplay by Aaron Bergeron. The film stars David Arquette and Justin Kirk, and features appearances by Dale Earnhardt Jr. and Darrell Waltrip. The Legend of Hallowdega was produced by RadicalMedia as branded content film for AMP Energy Juice, and was shot on location in Charlotte, NC and at Talladega Superspeedway, Alabama.

Plot
The host of an investigative news show joins forces with a techno-geek paranormal expert to dodge close-calls and chase crazy leads to get to the bottom of the mysteries around Talladega Superspeedway.

Cast
 David Arquette as Kiyash Monsef
 Justin Kirk as Host
 Dale Earnhardt Jr. as himself
 Darrell Waltrip as himself
 Buddy Baker as himself
 Buz McKim as himself

References

External links
 The Legend of Hallowdega - AMP Energy Juice
 Watch the film

2010 films
2010 black comedy films
2010s fantasy comedy films
American auto racing films
American black comedy films
American fantasy comedy films
American ghost films
American mockumentary films
Short films directed by Terry Gilliam
2010s ghost films
Self-reflexive films
Sponsored films
Promotional films
American comedy short films
2010 short films
2010 comedy films
2010s English-language films
2010s American films